The 13 May 1945 German deserter execution occurred five days after the capitulation of Nazi Germany along with the Wehrmacht armed forces in World War II, when an illegal court martial, composed of the captured and disarmed German officers kept under Allied guard in Amsterdam, Netherlands imposed a death sentence upon two former German deserters from the Kriegsmarine, Bruno Dorfer and .  The show trial occurred in an abandoned Ford Motor Company assembly plant outside Amsterdam, which at the time was a prisoner-of-war camp run by the Canadian Army.

The Nazi German prisoners of war formed a firing squad which carried out the sentence. They were supplied with captured German rifles and a three-ton truck by the Seaforth Highlanders of Canada, and escorted by a platoon of Canadian soldiers led by Captain Robert K. Swinton.

In an analysis of the incident the historian Chris Madsen notes that the Canadian military authorities felt obliged to work with their German counterparts, faced with the huge task of disarming and evacuating the German armed forces in the Netherlands, under discipline, and without disorder. As a matter of mutual convenience the German command hierarchy was allowed to continue to function following the surrender, and this included the sentencing and execution of individuals such as Dorfer and Beck under the Allies.

In popular culture
The incident provided much of the material for the final episode of Secret Army, a BBC drama series about the Belgian resistance in World War II.
The Italian-Yugoslavian film The Fifth Day of Peace (Italian title: Dio è con noi; 1969) dramatised the story of the two German sailors.
The 2006 Dutch film Black Book by director Paul Verhoeven includes the execution of a major character which is directly (but loosely) based on this incident.

References

External links
Menschlich bedrückend, Article in Der Spiegel magazine 12 September 1966 about the incident (in German).

Trials in the Netherlands
Military discipline and World War II
1945 in the Netherlands
1945 in Germany
People executed for desertion
May 1945 events in Europe